Paul Augustin Mayer, OSB (23 May 1911 – 30 April 2010) was a German Cardinal of the Roman Catholic Church. He held various positions in the Roman Curia from 1971 to 1991.

Biography
Mayer was born in Altötting, Germany, which is located near Marktl, the birthplace of Pope Benedict XVI. He joined the Order of Saint Benedict at the Abbey of St. Michael, Metten, taking the name of Augustin. He had his monastic profession on 17 May 1931. He studied at the University of Salzburg and at the Pontifical Athenaeum of Sant Anselmo in Rome.

He was ordained a Priest on 25 August 1935. After his ordination he was a faculty member at the abbey of Saint Michael from 1937 until 1939. He taught at the Pontifical Roman Athenaeum of Sant'Anselmo from 1939 until 1966, serving as its rector from 1949 until 1966. He was the Apostolic visitor to the Swiss seminaries from 1957 until 1959. He served as Secretary of the Preparatory Commission of the Second Vatican Council from 1960 until 1962. He was elected abbot of St. Michael's Abbey, Metten, Bavaria on 3 November 1966. He received the abbatial blessing from Rudolf Graber, bishop of Regensburg. He was appointed Secretary of the Congregation for Religious and Secular Institutes on 8 September 1971.

Episcopate
As secretary he was appointed titular archbishop of Satrianum by Pope Paul VI on 6 January 1972 and was consecrated on 13 February by Pope Paul, assisted by Bernardus Johannes Alfrink, Cardinal Archbishop of Utrecht, and William Conway, Cardinal Archbishop of Armagh. Pope John Paul II named him Pro-Prefect of the Congregation for Divine Worship and the Discipline of the Sacraments on 8 April 1984.

Cardinalate
He was created and proclaimed Cardinal-Deacon of Sant'Anselmo all'Aventino in the consistory of 25 May 1985. He was named full Prefect of the Congregation two days later. He presided over the unification of two distinct congregations that were united under one name from 1988 on. He resigned the prefecture on 1 July 1988. He was appointed the first President of the Pontifical Commission Ecclesia Dei the next day. The commission intends to return to full communion with the Holy See those traditionalist Catholics who are in a state of separation, of whom the Society of Saint Pius X is foremost. He lost the right to participate in a conclave when turned 80 years of age in 1991. He resigned the presidency on 1 July 1991. He opted for the order of cardinal priests and his deaconry was elevated pro hac vice to title on 29 January 1996.

He was the oldest living Cardinal from 2007 to his death. He died on 30 April 2010 in Rome.

See also

References

External links

1911 births
2010 deaths
20th-century German cardinals
21st-century German cardinals
Participants in the Second Vatican Council
University of Salzburg alumni
Members of the Congregation for Divine Worship and the Discipline of the Sacraments
Pontifical Commission Ecclesia Dei
Cardinals created by Pope John Paul II
Grand Crosses 1st class of the Order of Merit of the Federal Republic of Germany
German Benedictines
People from Altötting